Porpax is a genus of dragonflies in the family Libellulidae. The five species in the genus are all endemic to tropical Africa:
Porpax asperipes Karsch, 1896
Porpax risi Pinhey, 1958
Porpax garambensis Pinhey, 1966
Porpax bipunctus Pinhey, 1966
Porpax sentipes Dijkstra, 2006

References

Libellulidae
Odonata of Africa
Taxa named by Ferdinand Karsch
Anisoptera genera
Taxonomy articles created by Polbot